Westonbirt is a village in the civil parish of Westonbirt with Lasborough, in the district of Cotswold, in the county of Gloucestershire, England.

History
Westonbirt was recorded in the Domesday Book as Westone.

See also 
 Westonbirt House, a country house in Westonbirt
 Westonbirt School, which now occupies the house
 Westonbirt Arboretum

References

External links

Villages in Gloucestershire
Cotswold District